The National Football League 100th Anniversary All-Time Team was voted on by a panel consisting of media members, former players and league personnel in 2019 to honor the greatest players of the first 100 years of the National Football League (NFL). Tom Brady, Larry Fitzgerald, and Adam Vinatieri were the only active players when the team was revealed, while Bill Belichick was the only active head coach to be selected. Tom Brady was the last active player after his retirement following the 2022 NFL season. Johnny Unitas, Jim Brown, Gale Sayers, Don Hutson, Chuck Bednarik, Gino Marchetti, and Dick "Night Train" Lane are also part of the NFL 50th Anniversary All-Time Team and the NFL 75th Anniversary All-Time Team.

Selection process
The team was chosen by a panel of 26 voters made up of coaches, team and front office executives, former players and members of the media between April and June 2018. New England Patriots head coach Bill Belichick and Pro Football Hall of Fame head coach and former color commentator John Madden were also two of the voters and were in charge of looking over film and issuing a report to the committee on players in the early years of the league. There was a vote to trim the list to 160 in mid-May 2018, after considering the "Golden Era" players recommended by Belichick and Madden. Another debate was held in May with the final votes due on June 15, 2018.

Players were selected at each position group, and were voted in no order. There were 10 quarterbacks, 12 running backs, 10 wide receivers, 5 tight ends, 7 tackles, 7 guards, 4 centers, 7 defensive ends, 7 defensive tackles, 6 outside linebackers, 6 middle/inside linebackers, 7 cornerbacks, 6 safeties, 2 kickers, 2 punters, 2 kick/punt returners, and 10 coaches selected to the team. No long snappers were selected.

The roster was unveiled over six weeks on NFL Network by host Rich Eisen alongside Cris Collinsworth from NBC Sports and Belichick.

All-Time Team

Offense
Sources:

Bold denotes unanimous selection.

Defense
Sources:

Bold denotes unanimous selection.

Special teams
Sources:

Head coaches
Sources:

Finalists

Quarterbacks
On December 21 and December 22, 2019, quarterbacks Joe Montana and Tom Brady were announced as the first two quarterbacks to make it to the 100th Anniversary All-Time Team. On December 23, 2019 the remaining 20 finalists for the 100th Anniversary All-Time Team were announced. They included Troy Aikman, Sammy Baugh, Terry Bradshaw, Drew Brees, John Elway, Brett Favre, Dan Fouts, Otto Graham, Bobby Layne, Sid Luckman, Peyton Manning, Dan Marino, Joe Namath, Aaron Rodgers, Bart Starr, Roger Staubach, Fran Tarkenton, Johnny Unitas, Norm Van Brocklin, and Steve Young.

Running backs
On November 18, 2019, 24 running back finalists were announced. The finalists included Marcus Allen, Jerome Bettis, Jim Brown, Earl Campbell, Earl "Dutch" Clark, Eric Dickerson, Tony Dorsett, Marshall Faulk, Harold "Red" Grange, Franco Harris, Hugh McElhenny, Lenny Moore, Marion Motley, Bronko Nagurski, Walter Payton, Adrian Peterson, Barry Sanders, Gale Sayers, O.J. Simpson, Emmitt Smith, Jim Taylor, Thurman Thomas, LaDainian Tomlinson, and Steve Van Buren.

Wide receivers
On December 16, 2019, 24 wide receivers were announced as finalists for the 100th Anniversary All-Time Team. They included Lance Alworth, Raymond Berry, Fred Biletnikoff, Cris Carter, Tom Fears, Larry Fitzgerald, Marvin Harrison, Bob Hayes, Elroy "Crazylegs" Hirsch, Don Hutson, Michael Irvin, Calvin Johnson, Charlie Joiner, Steve Largent, Dante Lavelli, James Lofton, Don Maynard, Randy Moss, Terrell Owens, Pete Pihos, Jerry Rice,   John Stallworth, Charley Taylor, and Paul Warfield.

Tight ends
On December 9, 2019, 12 tight end finalists were announced, including Dave Casper, Mike Ditka, Antonio Gates, Tony Gonzalez, Rob Gronkowski, Ron Kramer, John Mackey, Ozzie Newsome, Charlie Sanders, Shannon Sharpe, Kellen Winslow, and Jason Witten.

Offensive linemen
On December 9, 2019, 40 offensive linemen were announced as finalists. Sixteen of the 40 finalists were tackles, including Bob "The Boomer" Brown, Roosevelt "Rosey" Brown, Lou Creekmur, Dan Dierdorf, Forrest Gregg, Cal Hubbard, Walter Jones, Ron Mix, Anthony Muñoz, Jonathan Ogden, Orlando Pace, Willie Roaf, Art Shell, Bob St. Clair, Joe Thomas, and Ron Yary. Fifteen of the 40 finalists were guards, including Larry Allen, Joe DeLamielleure, Dan Fortmann, John Hannah, Jerry Kramer, Larry Little, Tom Mack, Bruce Matthews, Randall McDaniel, Mike Michalske, Mike Munchak, Jim Parker, Will Shields, Dick Stanfel, and Gene Upshaw. Nine of the 40 finalists were centers, including Dermontti Dawson, Mel Hein, Jim Langer, Jim Otto, Jim Ringo, Dwight Stephenson, Mick Tingelhoff, Clyde "Bulldog" Turner and Mike Webster.

Defensive linemen
On November 25, 2019, 33 defensive linemen were announced as finalists. Seventeen of the 33 defensive linemen were defensive ends, including Doug Atkins, Willie Davis, Carl Eller, Len Ford, Bill Hewitt, Deacon Jones, Howie Long, Gino Marchetti, Julius Peppers, Andy Robustelli, Lee Roy Selmon, Bruce Smith, Michael Strahan, DeMarcus Ware, J. J. Watt, Reggie White, and Jack Youngblood. Sixteen of the 33 defensive linemen were defensive tackles, including Junious "Buck" Buchanan, Curley Culp, Art Donovan, "Mean" Joe Greene, Cortez Kennedy, Bob Lilly, Gene "Big Daddy" Lipscomb, Leo Nomellini, Merlin Olsen, Alan Page, John Randle, Warren Sapp, Tom Sestak, Ernie Stautner, Randy White, and Bill Willis.

Linebackers
On November 25, 2019, 25 linebacker finalists were announced. The finalists included Chuck Bednarik, Bobby Bell, Derrick Brooks, Dick Butkus, Harry Carson, Bill George, Kevin Greene, Jack Ham, Ted Hendricks, Clarke Hinkle, Sam Huff, Luke Kuechly, Jack Lambert, Willie Lanier, Ray Lewis, Von Miller, Ray Nitschke, Dave Robinson, Joe Schmidt, Junior Seau, Mike Singletary, Lawrence Taylor, Derrick Thomas, Brian Urlacher, and Dave Wilcox.

Defensive backs
On December 2, 2019, 30 defensive back finalists were announced. Sixteen of the 30 defensive back finalists were cornerbacks, including Herb Adderley, Champ Bailey, Lem Barney, Mel Blount, Willie Brown, Darrell Green, Mike Haynes, Jimmy Johnson, Dick "Night Train" Lane, Patrick Peterson, Mel Renfro, Darrelle Revis, Deion Sanders, Aeneas Williams, Charles Woodson, and Rod Woodson. Fourteen of the 30 defensive back finalists were safeties, including Jack Christiansen, Brian Dawkins, Kenny Easley, Ken Houston, Paul Krause, Yale Lary, Ronnie Lott, Troy Polamalu, Ed Reed, Johnny Robinson, Donnie Shell, Emlen Tunnell, Larry Wilson, and Willie Wood.

Special teamers
On December 2, 2019, 12 special teams finalists were announced. Four of the 12 special team finalists were kickers, including Morten Andersen, Lou Groza, Jan Stenerud, and Adam Vinatieri. Four of the 12 special team finalists were punters, including Ray Guy, Yale Lary, Shane Lechler, and Jerrel Wilson. Four of the 12 special team finalists were return specialists, including Mel Gray, Devin Hester, Billy "White Shoes" Johnson, and Brian Mitchell.

Coaches
On November 20, 2019, 20 head coaches were announced as finalists, including Bill Belichick, Paul Brown, Guy Chamberlin, Tony Dungy, Weeb Ewbank, Joe Gibbs, Sid Gillman, Bud Grant, George Halas, Curly Lambeau, Tom Landry, Marv Levy, Vince Lombardi, John Madden, Chuck Noll, Steve Owen, Bill Parcells, Fritz Pollard, Don Shula, and Bill Walsh.

Selection panel
Members of the 26 person panel were:

League voters
 Joel Bussert: Former NFL Vice President of Player Personnel and NFL historian
 Joe Horrigan: 42-year Pro Football Hall of Fame executive
 Chris Willis: NFL Films historian 

Coaches
 Bill Belichick: Six-time Super Bowl-winning head coach
 Tony Dungy: Pro Football Hall of Famer and Super Bowl-winning head coach
 Dick LeBeau: Pro Football Hall of Fame defensive back and two-time Super Bowl-winning defensive coordinator
 John Madden: Pro Football Hall of Famer and Super Bowl-winning head coach
 Don Shula: Pro Football Hall of Famer and two-time Super Bowl-winning head coach
 Dick Vermeil: Super Bowl-winning head coach

General managers
 Ernie Accorsi: 19-year NFL general manager
 Gil Brandt: Pro Football Hall of Famer and two-time Super Bowl-winning front office executive
 Charley Casserly: Super Bowl-winning general manager
 Bill Polian: Pro Football Hall of Famer and Super Bowl-winning general manager
 Ron Wolf: Pro Football Hall of Famer and three-time Super Bowl-winning general manager

Players
 Dan Fouts: Pro Football Hall of Fame quarterback and veteran broadcaster
 Ron Jaworski: Former NFL quarterback and veteran broadcaster
 Ozzie Newsome: Pro Football Hall of Fame tight end and two-time Super Bowl-winning general manager
 Art Shell: Pro Football Hall of Fame offensive tackle, two-time Super Bowl champion and former head coach

Media
 Dave Anderson: Pulitzer Prize-winning columnist with The New York Times who covered the NFL for more than 50 years
 Judy Battista: NFL Media national columnist and reporter
 Jarrett Bell: Pro Football Hall of Fame voter and USA Today NFL columnist
 Chris Berman: ESPN anchor since 1979
 Rick Gosselin: Pro Football Hall of Fame voter and former Dallas Morning News columnist
 Peter King: Pro Football Hall of Fame voter and veteran sportswriter
 Don Pierson: Author and veteran sportswriter
 Charean Williams: Pro Football Hall of Fame voter, veteran sportswriter and president of the Pro Football Writers Association

See also
National Football League All-Decade Teams
National Football League 50th Anniversary All-Time Team
National Football League 75th Anniversary All-Time Team
The Top 100: NFL's Greatest Players

Notes

References

100th